Stay with Me is a 2004 Italian romantic drama film written and directed by Livia Giampalmo.

Cast 

 Giovanna Mezzogiorno: Chiara
 Adriano Giannini: Nanni
 Claudio Gioè: Rodolfo
 Paolo Briguglia: Don Marco

See also 
 List of Italian films of 2004

References

External links

2004 films
Italian romantic drama films
2004 romantic drama films
2000s Italian films